Stefan Eriksson (born 17 October 1963) is a former professional tennis player from Sweden.

Career
Eriksson competed in four Grand Slam tournaments during his career but was unable to register a win. In the 1987 Wimbledon Championships he lost to future champion Stefan Edberg 0–6, 0–6, 0–6. It was the first ever Wimbledon match in the open era to be decided in just 18 games and first shutout at the tournament since 1947.

His best result on tour came at the Cologne tournament in 1986, when he finished runner-up. He upset world number nine Anders Järryd in the semi-finals. The Swede had two further wins over top 30 players that year, beating Slobodan Živojinović in Basel and Milan Šrejber in Vienna.

On the doubles circuit, Eriksson reached the quarter-finals at the Indianapolis Clay Court Championships in both 1985 and 1986, partnering Mikael Pernfors. He went further at Toulouse in 1985, making the semi-finals, with Peter Lundgren.

Grand Prix career finals

Singles: 1 (0–1)

Challenger titles

Singles: (1)

Doubles: (1)

References

1963 births
Living people
Swedish male tennis players
People from Enköping
Sportspeople from Uppsala County